2018 Intercounty Baseball League season was the 100th season of the Intercounty Baseball League. It started on May 6 and ended on September 6.

Teams 
Barrie Baycats
Brantford Red Sox#
Burlington Herd
Guelph Royals#
Hamilton Cardinals
Kitchener Panthers#
London Majors
Toronto Maple Leafs

The teams with # will celebrate the 100th anniversary since the League formed.

Standing 
All teams qualify for the playoff.
The game between Barrie and Toronto was cancelled.

Playoffs

Jack and Lynne Dominico Trophy: Barrie Baycats (7-0) vs Kitchener Panthers (7-0)

Game 1 

Kitchener leads the series 1-0

Game 2 

Barrie ties the series 1-1

Game 3 

Barrie leads the series 2-1

Game 4 

Kitchener ties the series 2-2

Game 5 

Barrie leads the series 3-2

Game 6 

Barrie wins the series 4-2

Stats 
Regular season
Battling
Average: .403 (48 hits-119 at bats, Jordan Castaldo, BAR)
Hit: 49 (both Grant Arnold, HAM and Justin Gideon, BUR)
Home run: 12 (both Sean Reilly, GUE and Cleveland Brownlee, LDN)
Double: 14 (Jordan Castaldo, BAR)
Triple: 4 (Vaughn Bryan, BUR)
Run: 40 (Jordan Castaldo, BAR)
RBI: 46 (Cleveland Brownlee, LDN)
Pitching
ERA: 0.38 (47 IP-3 ER, Frank Garces, BAR)
Win: 8 (both 2 lose, Starlin Peralta, LDN and Emilis Guerrero, BAR)
Strikeout: 112 (Edwin Javier, GUE)
Save: 8 (Miguel Lahera, KIT)
IP: 85.2 (Yunior Yambatis, GUE)
Fielding
Put out: 272 (Nic Burdett, BRA)
Assist: 106 (Yorbis Borroto, KIT)
Percentage: 1.000 (160 players tied)
Playoff
Battling
Average: .444 (4 hits-9 at bats,  and  both )
Hit:
Home run:
Double:
Triple:
Run:
RBI:
Pitching
ERA:
Win:
Strikeout:
Save:
IP:
Fielding
Put out:
Assist:
Percentage:

Awards 
Jack and Lynne Dominico Trophy
John Bell Memorial Trophy
Brian Kerr Memorial Trophy

References 

2